The "Second Happy Time" (officially  Operation Paukenschlag ("Operation Drumbeat"), and also known among German submarine commanders as the "American Shooting Season") was a phase in the Battle of the Atlantic during which Axis submarines attacked merchant shipping and Allied naval vessels along the east coast of North America. The first "Happy Time" was in 1940–1941 in the North Atlantic and North Sea. Adolf Hitler and Benito Mussolini declared war on the United States on 11 December 1941, and as a result their navies could begin the "Second Happy Time".

The "Second Happy Time" lasted from January 1942 to about August of that year and involved several German naval operations, including Operation Neuland. German submariners named it the "Happy Time" or the "Golden Time," as defense measures were weak and disorganized, and the U-boats were able to inflict massive damage with little risk. During this period, Axis submarines sank 609 ships totaling 3.1 million tons. This led to the loss of thousands of lives, mainly those of merchant mariners, against a loss of only 22 U-boats. Although fewer than the losses during the 1917 campaign of the First World War, those of this period equaled roughly one quarter of all ships sunk by U-boats during the entire Second World War.

Historian Michael Gannon called it "America's Second Pearl Harbor" and placed the blame for the nation's failure to respond quickly to the attacks on the inaction of Admiral Ernest J. King, commander-in-chief of the United States Navy (USN). Because King also refused British offers to provide the US navy with their own ships, the belated institution of a convoy system was in large part due to a severe shortage of suitable escort vessels, without which convoys were seen as actually more vulnerable than lone ships.

Background

German intentions
Upon Germany's declaration of war on the United States on 11 December 1941 just after the attack on Pearl Harbor, the US was, on paper at least, in a fortunate position. Where the other combatants on the Allied side had already lost thousands of trained sailors and airmen, and were experiencing shortages of ships and aircraft, the US was at full strength (save for its recent losses at Pearl Harbor). The US had the opportunity to learn about modern naval warfare by observing the conflicts in the North Sea and the Mediterranean, and through a close relationship with the United Kingdom. The USN had already gained significant experience in countering U-boats in the Atlantic, particularly from April 1941 when President Franklin D. Roosevelt extended the "Pan-American Security Zone" east almost as far as Iceland. The United States had massive manufacturing capacity and a favorable geographical position from a defensive point of view: the port of New York, for example, was 3,000 miles to the west of the U-boat bases in Brittany.

U-boat commander Vizeadmiral Karl Dönitz saw the entry of the US into the war as a golden opportunity to strike heavy blows in the tonnage war and Hitler ordered an assault on America on 12 December 1941. The standard Type VII submarine had insufficient range to patrol off the coast of North America (although, in due time, Type VII submarines were successfully able to patrol off the eastern seaboard of North America, due to refueling, rearming, and resupply logistical support by Type XIV submarine tender); the only suitable weapons he had on hand were the larger Type IX. These were less maneuverable and slower to submerge, making them much more vulnerable than the Type VIIs. They were also fewer in number.

American deficiencies

The American response in early 1942 was hampered by poor organization and doctrine, and a lack of anti-submarine warfare (ASW) aircraft, ships, and personnel.

The USN entered the war without the equivalent of the British Black Swan-class sloop or the  despite previous involvement in the Atlantic (see .) The massive new naval construction program prioritized other types of ships. Fleet destroyers did not have the qualities for ASW; the ideal ASW escort had relatively low speed; carried a large number of depth charges; was highly maneuverable; and had long endurance. The fifty World War I-era destroyers transferred to Britain in the 1941 Destroyers for Bases Agreement would have been poor ASW escorts, even had they been retained, due to poor maneuverability.

The USN did have some destroyers available on the east coast at the time of the first attacks; it had previously recalled at least 25 Atlantic Convoy Escort Command Destroyers, including seven at anchor in New York Harbor. However, the USN initially refused to use them as escorts even as losses mounted. When the first destroyers were finally released, their employment was hampered by poor doctrine. They were assigned to offensive patrols rather than escorting convoys due to public and political pressure. As late as March, USN escort doctrine was aggressive with an emphasis on destroying attackers, rather than stopping losses. The option of pressing small civilian ships into service as rudimentary convoy escorts in early 1942 was not exercised.

Even if escorts had been available, the USN was unprepared to perform "Naval Control of Shipping" (NCS), the control and tracking of shipping (in convoy or sailing independently), although it had already received the reference material from Canada. Furthermore, without escorts the US could not even take advantage of the existing Allied NCS. NCS for shipping in the western Atlantic north of the equator was handled by the Royal Canadian Navy (RCN) since the start of the war; the RCN only passed the responsibility to the USN in July 1942.

Operationally, the USN's ASW effort was fragmented. In theory, Admiral King was responsible for coordinating all ASW activities, including the development of doctrine. In practice, King's many other responsibilities prevented him from doing an adequate job. Therefore, the three Atlantic operational commands - the Atlantic Fleet, the Eastern Sea Frontier, and the Gulf Sea Frontier - were left to develop their own ASW tactics individually. The issue was not resolved until May 1943 with the formation of the United States Tenth Fleet.

British experience in the first two years of World War II, which included the massive losses incurred to their shipping during the "First Happy Time" confirmed that ships sailing in convoy – with or without escort – were far safer than ships sailing alone. The British recommended that merchant ships should avoid obvious standard routings wherever possible; navigational markers, lighthouses, and other aids to the enemy should be removed, and a strict coastal blackout be enforced. In addition, any available air and sea forces should perform daylight patrols to restrict the U-boats' flexibility. For several months, none of the recommendations were followed. Coastal shipping continued to sail along marked routes and burn normal navigation lights. Boardwalk communities ashore were only 'requested' to 'consider' turning their illuminations off on 18 December 1941, but not in the cities; they did not want to offend the tourism, recreation and business sectors. 

The primary target area was the Eastern Sea Frontier, commanded by Rear-Admiral Adolphus Andrews and covering the area from Maine to North Carolina. Andrews had practically no modern forces to work with: on the water he commanded seven Coast Guard cutters, four converted yachts, three 1919-vintage patrol boats, two gunboats dating back to 1905, and four wooden submarine chasers. About 100 aircraft were available, but these were short-range models only suitable for training. As a consequence of the traditionally antagonistic relationship between the USN and the Army Air Forces, all larger aircraft remained under USAAF control, and in any case the USAAF was neither trained nor equipped for ASW.

Campaign

Opening moves 
Immediately after war was declared on the United States, Dönitz began to implement Operation Paukenschlag (often translated as "drumbeat" or "drumroll", and literally as "timpani beat"). Only six of the twenty operational Type IX boats were available, and one of those six encountered mechanical trouble. This left just five long-range submarines for the opening moves of the campaign.

Loaded with the maximum possible amounts of fuel, food and ammunition, the first of the five Type IXs left Lorient in France on 18 December 1941, the others following over the next few days. Each carried sealed orders to be opened after passing 20°W, and directing them to different parts of the North American coast.

Each U-boat made routine signals on exiting the Bay of Biscay, which were picked up by the British Y service and plotted in Rodger Winn's London Submarine Tracking Room, which were then able to follow the progress of the Type IXs across the Atlantic, and cable an early warning to the RCN. Working on the slimmest of evidence, Winn correctly deduced the target area and passed a detailed warning to Admiral King, of a "heavy concentration of U-boats off the North American seaboard", including the five boats already on station and further groups that were in transit, 21 U-boats in all. Rear-Admiral Edwin T. Layton of the US Combined Operations and Intelligence Center then informed the responsible area commanders, but little or nothing else was done.

On 12 January 1942, Admiral Andrews was warned that "three or four U-boats" were about to commence operations against coastal shipping (in fact, there were indeed three), but he refused to institute a convoy system on the grounds that this would only provide the U-boats with more targets.

When  sank the 9,500-ton Norwegian tanker Norness within sight of Long Island in the early hours of 14 January, no warships were dispatched to investigate, allowing the U-123 to sink the 6,700-ton British tanker Coimbra off Sandy Hook on the following night before proceeding south towards New Jersey. By this time there were 13 destroyers idle in New York Harbor, yet none were employed to deal with the immediate threat, and over the following nights U-123 was presented with a succession of easy targets, most of them burning navigation lamps. At times, U-123 was operating in coastal waters that were so shallow that they barely allowed it to conceal itself, let alone evade a depth charge attack.

Operation Drumbeat 
The first attack wave, Operation Drumbeat, consisted of five Type IX boats. Their first victory upon arriving in the coastal region of North America was the Canadian freighter Cyclops, sunk on 12 January off Nova Scotia. According to Robert Fisher, 26 more ships were sunk in the following nine days. The boats cruised along the coast, safely submerged through the day, and surfacing at night to pick off merchant vessels outlined against the lights of the cities.

 Reinhard Hardegen in  sank seven ships totalling 46,744 tons before he ran out of torpedoes and returned to base;
 Ernst Kals in  sank six ships of 36,988 tons;
 Robert-Richard Zapp in  sank five ships of 33,456 tons;
 Heinrich Bleichrodt in  sank four ships of 27,651 tons; and
 Ulrich Folkers on his first patrol in  sank one 6,666-ton vessel, the West Ivis (he was criticized by Dönitz for his poor performance, although he would later win the Knight's Cross of the Iron Cross).

When the first wave of U-boats returned to port through the early part of February, Dönitz wrote that each commander "had such an abundance of opportunities for attack that he could not by any means utilize them all: there were times when there were up to ten ships in sight, sailing with all lights burning on peacetime courses."

The RCN immediately organized coastal convoys when Drumbeat began despite the difficulty in finding escorts. 37 ships were lost in January and February, and only 11 in March and April. The RCN noted that by March and April the U-boats preferred hunting in US waters.

U-boats in the Caribbean and the Gulf of Mexico

Meanwhile, the second wave of Type IX boats had arrived in North American waters, and the third wave (Operation Neuland) had reached its patrol area off the oil ports of the Caribbean. With such easy pickings available and all Type IX boats already committed, Dönitz began sending shorter-range Type VIIs to the US East Coast as well. This required extraordinary measures: cramming every conceivable space with provisions, some even filling the fresh water tanks with diesel oil, and crossing the Atlantic at very low speed on a single engine to conserve fuel.

In the United States there was still no concerted response to the attacks. Overall responsibility rested with Admiral King, but he was preoccupied with the Japanese onslaught in the Pacific. Admiral Andrews' North Atlantic Coastal Frontier was expanded to take in South Carolina and renamed the Eastern Sea Frontier (ESF), but most of the ships and aircraft needed remained under the command of Admiral Royal E. Ingersoll, Commander-in-Chief, Atlantic Fleet, who was often at sea and unavailable to make decisions. Rodger Winn's detailed weekly U-boat situation reports from the Submarine Tracking Room in London were available but ignored. By April, Allied forces along the US east coast included 80 small patrol ships in the USN Eastern Sea Frontier, 160 US aircraft, 24 RN ASW trawlers, and one British Coastal Command squadron. By British and Canadian standards these were enough to begin convoying, but no comprehensive convoy system was implemented that month. Instead, on 1 April the US implemented a partial convoy system where convoys moved along the coast in short hops, moving during daytime and stopping in protected anchorages during nights; these were slow and ineffective.

Coastal forces were reinforced from the Mid-Ocean Escort Force (MOEF). Redeployments began before March. The US contribution to the MOEF fell to part of a single group. Five RCN corvettes were withdrawn to escort the new Boston-Halifax convoys, the first convoys along the American seaboard. In April, a Royal Navy (RN) group redeployed to the Caribbean to defend tankers. The RCN attempted to reinforce the MOEF by using training ships in supporting roles.

Allied tanker losses were alarming. Losses along the North American coast and in the Caribbean accounted for most of the 73 American tankers lost in the first half of 1942, and 22 British tankers lost in March; three out of the four largest Canadian tankers were also lost from February to May. In March, British Prime Minister Winston Churchill urged the USN to organize coastal convoys, to little effect. The next month, British tankers from the Caribbean avoided the US coast and sailed east to Freetown in Africa, while between 16 to 29 April the US ordered US and Caribbean coastal waters closed to commercial tanker movement. On 26 April, the US agreed to allow Britain to redeploy a MOEF group to establish Caribbean convoys, but the US refused to start its own Caribbean convoys or to provide escorts.

Eastern Canada was dependent on imported oil from the Gulf of Mexico and the Caribbean. The crisis led to nation-wide gasoline rationing on 1 April, and the potential consequences of the US-ordered halt to tanker movements were severe. On 28 April, the RCN started ad hoc convoys to bring Canadian, and Canadian-charted, tankers trapped in the US and the Caribbean back to Halifax. On 1 May, the Government of Canada insisted that Canadian tankers be escorted, leading the RCN to organize formal convoys to the Caribbean through US coastal waters. The RCN had only enough escorts to run convoys from Halifax to Trinidad (coded as TH); the loss of supply from other regional suppliers had to be accepted. In July, Trinidad was replaced by Aruba to accommodate British tanker movement. From May to August, fourteen convoys - including 76 tankers and 4 million barrels of oil - were run without a single ship lost. The convoys were discontinued in August with the advent of the US's comprehensive convoying system.

Canada also implemented convoys between Nova Scotia and Quebec City in May.

On 21 April, U-459 was 600 miles north-west of Bermuda; it refuelled fourteen U-boats through 6 May, including Type VIIs, headed for the Gulf and the Caribbean. In May, they sank 115 ships (of which 101 were steaming independently), about half being in the Gulf, with half of that tonnage being tankers. In June, they sank 122 ships, of which 108 were sailing independently. The Gulf Sea Frontier, formed in early February, had barely any resources and was ineffective.

US convoys arrive 
The first organized US coastal convoy sailed on 14 May 1942 from Hampton Roads for Key West; convoys eventually extended to Halifax. The US sought another  15 to 20 corvettes from Britain. By this time, two British escort groups were already in the Caribbean and the MOEF was under strain. Nonetheless, Britain and Canada responded to US requests by reducing the size of the remaining MOEF groups. The MOEF and the RCN had no further slack. The RCN struggled to meet its commitments even with 90% of its escort fleet being operational, as opposed to being used for training or being refitted; the negative effects of this over-extension would be felt well into 1943.  By comparison the RN escort fleet was merely two-thirds operational. The weakening of MOEF contributed to difficulties in the mid-Atlantic in August. 

The US convoy system effectively brought the crisis to an end. By early-July most U-boats only operated along the perimeter of the Caribbean. German attention returned to the mid-Atlantic.

US propaganda 
Popular alarm at the sinkings was dealt with by a combination of secrecy and misleading propaganda. The US Navy confidently announced that many of the U-boats would "never enjoy the return portion of their voyage" but that unfortunately, details of the sunken U-boats could not be made public lest the information aid the enemy. All citizens who had witnessed the sinking of a U-boat were asked to help keep the secrets safe.

Allied merchant losses
 22 January – US freighter Norvana sunk by U-123 south of Cape Hatteras (no survivors)
 26 January – US freighter West Ivis sunk by U-125 (all 45 crewmen perished)
 27 January – US tanker Halo damaged by U-130 at 
 31 January – US Tacoma Star sunk by U-109 at 
 5 February – US tanker China Arrow sunk by U-103 at 
 6 February – US freighter Major Wheeler sunk by U-107 (all 35 crewmen perished)
 15 February – Brazilian steamship Buarque sunk by U-432 at 
 18 February – Brazilian tanker Olinda sunk by U-432 at 
 26 February – US bulk carrier Marore sunk by U-432 at 
 28 February – US destroyer  sunk by U-578 at 
 7 March – US freighter Barbara sunk by U-126 at 
 7 March – US freighter Cardonia sunk by U-126 at 
 10 March – US tanker Gulftrade sunk by U-588 at 
 11 March – US freighter Texan sunk by U-126 at 
 11 March – US freighter Caribsea sunk by U-158 at 
 12 March – US freighter Olga sunk by U-126 at 
 12 March – US freighter Colabee damaged by U-126 at 
 14 March – US collier Lemuel Burrows sunk by U-404 at 
 15 March – US tanker Olean sunk by U-158 at 
 16 March – US tanker Australia sunk by U-332 at 
 17 March – Greek freighter Kassandra Louloudi sunk by U-124 four mile off Diamond Shoals gas buoy
 17 March – Honduran freighter Ceiba sunk by U-124 at 
 18 March – US tanker  sunk by U-124 at 
 18 March – US tanker Papoose sunk by U-124 at 
 21 March – US tanker Esso Nashville sunk by U-124 at 
 21 March – US tanker Atlantic Sun damaged by U-124
 26 March – Panamanian tanker Equipoise sunk by U-160 at 
 31 March – US tanker Tiger sunk by U-754 (1 of 43 crewmen perishes)
 6 April – US tanker Bidwell damaged by U-160  (1 of 33 crewmen perishes)
 7 April – Norwegian freighter Lancing sunk by U-552 off Cape Hatteras
 7 April – British tanker British Splendour sunk by U-552 off Cape Hatteras (12 of 53 crew and gunners were lost)
 9 April – US freighter Esparta sunk by U-123  (1 of 40 crewmen perishes)
 12 April – Panamanian tanker Stanvac Melbourne sunk by U-203 at 
 18 April – US tanker Axtell J. Byles damaged by U-136 at 
 20 April – US freighter West Imboden sunk by U-752 at 
 21 April – US freighter Pipestone County sunk by U-576 at 
 29 April – US tanker Mobiloil sunk by U-108 at 
 5 May – US freighter Afoundria sunk by U-108 at 
 6 May – US freighter Alcoa Puritan sunk by U-507 at 
 13 May – US tanker Gulfprince damaged by U-507 at 
 16 May – US tanker Sun damaged by U-506 at 
 26 May – US freighter Atenas damaged by U-106 at 

U-Boat losses
 : sunk on 3 July by the Armed ASW Trawler HMS Le Tiger in position  by depth charges
 : sunk on 30 July by the US Navy patrol craft, PC 566, in position  in the Gulf of Mexico, the only U-boat sunk in the Gulf of Mexico during World War II
 : sunk on 27 September 1942 by a Vickers Wellington of 311/Q Squadron, RAF (with a Czech aircrew)
 : sunk on 5 November 1942 by aircraft of No. 120 Squadron RAF.
 : sunk 17 November 1942 by Fairey Albacores of 817 Naval Air Squadron from the aircraft carrier .
 : lost at sea 28 January 1943
 : active in the east coast operations, rammed and sunk on 17 February 1943 by 
 : active in the east coast operations, sunk 2 August 1943, by aircraft attack by No. 461 Squadron RAAF flown by Flight Lieutenant A. F. Clarke.

See also 
 First Happy Time

References 
Notes

Bibliography

 Bauer, E. The History of the Second World War.
 
 Blair, Clay Hitler's U-Boat War: The Hunters 1939–1942 Random House (1996) 
 
 
 Ellis, John. The World War II Databook: The Essential Facts and Figures for All the Combatants. London: Aurum Press, 1993. .
 Fairbank White, David. Bitter Ocean: The dramatic story of the Battle of the Atlantic 1939–1945, 2006, Headline Publishing Group, .
 
 Gannon, Michael. Operation Drumbeat: The Dramatic True Story of Germany's First U-Boat Attacks Along the American Coast in World War II. New York: Harper & Row, 1990. .
 
 Morison, Samuel Eliot. A History of U.S. Naval Operations in World War II Vol. I: The Battle of the Atlantic, September 1939 – May 1943. Boston: Little, Brown, 1947.

 Tennant, Alan J. British and Commonwealth Merchant Ship Losses to Axis Submarines 1939-1945 Sutton (2001) 
 U-Boat War. (2001). BFS Video. . .

External links 
 
 No 53 Squadron, Royal Air Force, list of bases
 More information about RN Armed Trawlers and the Royal Naval Patrol Service in WW2

Battle of the Atlantic
Naval battles of World War II involving Germany
Naval battles of World War II involving the United States
Naval battles of World War II involving Canada